{{DISPLAYTITLE:C7H5NO4}}
The molecular formula C7H5NO4 (molar mass: 167.12 g/mol) may refer to:

 Dinicotinic acid, a dicarboxylic acid
 Dipicolinic acid, a dicarboxylic acid
 Nitrobenzoic acids, a group of benzoic acid derivatives
 2-Nitrobenzoic acid
 3-Nitrobenzoic acid
 4-Nitrobenzoic acid
 Lutidinic acid, a dicarboxylic acid
 Quinolinic acid, a dicarboxylic acid